The Bulgarian Patriots was a nationalist electoral alliance formed by the IMRO – Bulgarian National Movement, Volya Movement and National Front for the Salvation of Bulgaria.

The leaders of the three parties will not be MP candidates, as proposed by Karakachanov, due to previous infighting that brought down earlier "patriotic" coalitions.

Electoral history

References

2021 establishments in Bulgaria
Conservative parties in Bulgaria
Defunct political party alliances in Bulgaria
Eurosceptic parties in Bulgaria
Far-right parties in Europe
National conservative parties
Nationalist parties in Bulgaria
Political parties established in 2021
Political parties disestablished in 2021
Right-wing populism in Bulgaria
Right-wing populist parties
Social conservative parties